Academia Secondary School is a secondary school in Windhoek, Namibia. It is situated in the Academia suburb.

Forty years ago on 22 January 1975, Academia Secondary School opened for the first time with 19 staff members and 227 pupils in Standard 5 to 7 (now Grade 7 to 9), led by the Principal PJ Scholtz.

The school has a Model UN club that participated in the 2014 Model United Nations Namibia High School Conference.

See also
 Education in Namibia
 List of schools in Namibia

References

Schools in Windhoek
Educational institutions established in 1975
1975 establishments in South West Africa